Andrew Lepani (born 28 August 1979) in Port Moresby, Papua New Guinea, is a footballer who played as a midfielder for PS United Port Moresby, Cosmos Port Moresby and Hekari United in the Papua New Guinea National Soccer League and the Papua New Guinea national football team.

References

1979 births
Living people
Papua New Guinean footballers
Papua New Guinea international footballers
Association football midfielders
People from the National Capital District (Papua New Guinea)
2012 OFC Nations Cup players